Talamadugu is a village in Adilabad district in the state of Telangana in India. Talamadugu railway station is located on Adilabad line.

References 

Villages in Adilabad district
Mandal headquarters in Adilabad district